Cool & Collected is a compilation album by American jazz musician Miles Davis, released in 2006 by Columbia Records and recorded from 1955 through 1984.

Track listing 
"So What" (Davis) – 9:23
"Summertime [From Porgy and Bess]" (George Gershwin, Ira Gershwin, DuBose Heyward) – 3:20
"Généerique [From Ascenseur pour l'échafaud]" (Davis) – 2:48
"Stella by Starlight" (Ned Washington, Victor Young) – 4:45
"Fran-Dance" (Davis) – 5:52
"Milestones" (Davis) – 5:44
"'Round Midnight" (Bernie Hanighen, Thelonious Monk, Cootie Williams) – 5:57
"Bye Bye Blackbird" (Mort Dixon, Ray Henderson) – 7:55
"Seven Steps to Heaven" (Davis, Victor Feldman) – 6:25
"Time After Time" (Rob Hyman, Cyndi Lauper) – 3:38
"E.S.P." (Wayne Shorter) – 5:30
"Human Nature" (John Bettis, Steve Porcaro) – 4:30
"It's About That Time [Remix]" (Davis) – 3:40

Personnel

Cannonball Adderley – alto saxophone
Julian "Cannonball" Adderley – alto saxophone
Geri Allen – Fender Rhodes
George Avakian – production
Danny Bank – bass clarinet, alto flute
Bill Barber – tuba
Bob Belden – digital remastering
Joe Bennett & the Sparkletones – trombone
Bob Berg – tenor saxophone
Steven Berkowitz – executive production, production
Niko Bolas – engineering
Stacey Boyle – A&R
Ron Carter – upright bass
Bob Cato – photography
Paul Chambers – upright bass
Harold Chapman – engineering
Tom Choi – project manager
Kenny Clarke – drums
Jimmy Cleveland – trombone
Johnny Coles – trumpet
John Coltrane – tenor saxophone
Chick Corea – keyboard, piano
Jason Dale – assistant engineering
Miles Davis – composing, producing, trumpet
Didier C. Deutsch – A&R
Charley Drayton – double bass, production, programming
Bill Evans – piano
Gil Evans – arranging, conducting
Azize Faye – African drums
Al Foster – drums
Jim Gaines – engineering
Red Garland – piano
Bernie Glow – trumpet
Herbie Hancock – piano
Bernie Hanighen – composer
Dick Hixon – trombone
Jeremy Holiday – A&R
Dave Holland – bass
Johnny Hoyt – engineering, remixing
Don Hunstein – photography
Robert Irving III – keyboards, producing
Darryl Jones – electric bass
Philly Joe Jones – drums
Oren Karpovsky – assistant engineering
Frank Laico – engineering
Cal Lampely – producing
Teo Macero – audio production, production
Ndongo Mbaye – talking drum
John McLaughlin – classic guitar
Pierre Michelot – bass
Thelonious Monk – composer
Louis Mucci – trumpet
June Murakawa – mixing assistant
Romeo Penque – clarinet, flute, alto flute
Fred Plaut – engineering
Frank Rehak – trombone
Jerome Richardson – clarinet, flute, alto flute
Marcel Romano – producing
Seth Rothstein – project director
Ernie Royal – trumpet
Willie Ruff – French horn
Carlos Santana – guitar
Eddy Schreyer – mastering
Gunther Schuller – French horn
John Scofield – guitar
Wayne Shorter – tenor saxophone
Vernon Smith – photography
Tom Swift – engineering
Steve Thornton – percussion
Pat Thrall – guitar, mixing, producing, programming, remixing
Stan Tonkel – engineering
Irving Townsend – producer
René Urtreger – piano
Ned Washington – composer
Julius Watkins – French horn
Mark Wilder – digital remastering
Barney Wilen – tenor saxophone
Cootie Williams – composer
Tony Williams – drums
Tony Ruption Williams – drums
Victor Young – composer
Joe Zawinul – keyboards, piano
Joel Zimmerman – cover design

Charting and reviews

Reviews

Charting history

Certifications

References

External links

2006 compilation albums
Albums produced by George Avakian
Albums produced by Teo Macero
Albums produced by Steven Berkowitz
Albums produced by Miles Davis
Albums produced by Charley Drayton
Albums produced by Robert Irving III
Albums produced by Cal Lampley
Albums produced by Pat Thrall
Albums produced by Irving Townsend
Miles Davis compilation albums
Columbia Records compilation albums
Albums recorded at CBS 30th Street Studio